Hermann Walther von der Dunk (October 9, 1928 in Bonn – August 22, 2018 in Bilthoven) was a Dutch historian of German origin.

Life 
Von der Dunk's family fled from Nazi-Germany to the Netherlands in 1937. As his mother was Jewish, his father could not find any work under National Socialist regime. His father found a position at the school of Kees Boeke in Bilthoven. Later, Hermann von der Dunk visited the nearby University of Utrecht. There, he studied history under professor Pieter Geyl and later studied at the Leibniz Institute of European History in Mainz. In 1966 he finished his dissertation (in German) on "Der Deutsche Vormärz und Belgien, 1930-1948" ("The German Vormärz and Belgium, 1830-1848"). One year later, in 1967, von der Dunk became professor for modern and contemporary history as well as cultural history at the University of Utrecht and stayed in this position until 1990. His early retirement was (at least in part) a reaction to the commercialization and bureaucratization of the universities. He specialized in European and Dutch history, as well as Dutch-German relationships. Much of his work focused on "modernity and anti-modern responses", he wrote several monographs and regularly published articles in Dutch newspapers and journals. In 1995 he received the Goethe Medal.

He was elected member of the Royal Netherlands Academy of Arts and Sciences  in 1986.

Works 
 Der Deutsche Vormärz und Belgien, 1830/48. Wiesbaden, F. Steiner, 1966.
 De verdwijnende hemel. Over de cultuur van Europa in de twintigste eeuw. 2 volumes. Amsterdam, Meulenhoff, 2000.

References 

 

1928 births
2018 deaths
20th-century Dutch historians
Dutch people of German descent
Dutch people of German-Jewish descent
Historians of the Netherlands
Historians of Germany
Members of the Royal Netherlands Academy of Arts and Sciences